The Keene Memorial Stakes was an American Thoroughbred horse race run for twenty years from 1913 through 1932 at Belmont Park, in Elmont, New York. The race was created to honor James R. Keene who died on January 3, 1913. A Wall Street stockbroker, Keene was a major owner and breeder of Thoroughbred racehorses and would become one of the U.S. Racing Hall of Fame's Pillars of the Turf.

Historical notes
The distance for the first two editions of the Keene Memorial Stakes were set at six furlongs over the main course. Then, in 1915 the race was shortened to five and one-half furlongs and transferred to the track's straight course. In 1926 the distance was reduced to four and one-half furlongs.

Reflecting a recognition by stable owners of James R. Keene's place in Thoroughbred racing history, every single winner of the Keene Memorial Stakes during the twenty years it was run was owned by one of the Who's Who of that era.

The inaugural running of the Keene Memorial Stakes took place on July 5, 1913 and was won by the filly Stake and Cap. She was owned by the prominent Virginia businessman Thomas Fortune Ryan who raced under the nom de course Oak Ridge Stable. 

The 1914 Keene Memorial was won by James Butler's filly Comely for whom the Comely Stakes at Aqueduct Racetrack would be named.  James R. Keene was the breeder of Comely and sold her in a package deal to James Butler who bought the entire 1912 crop produced by his Castleton Stud.

The 1917 Keene Memorial Stakes was run in a heavy rainstorm and no time was recorded.

Just three days after winning his career debut the legendary Man o' War easily won the 1919 edition. 

The 1925 winner Friar's Carse went on to earn American Champion Two-Year-Old Filly honors.

In 1930, that year's American Champion Two-Year-Old Colt Equipoise would have a career that saw him earn at total of six National Championship honors including twice as the American Horse of the Year and become a National Museum of Racing and Hall of Fame inductee. 

The 1932 Keene Memorial Stakes was won by Sonny Whitney's colt Caterwaul who defeated ten other two-year-olds.

By late fall of 1932 the Great Depression saw economic conditions worsening which forced the Westchester Racing Association, operators of Belmont Park, to eliminate five races. As a result, the May 14, 1932 race would prove to be the Keene Memorial's final running.

Records
Speed record:
 1:05 0/0 @ 5.5 furlongs : Ormsdale
 0:51 2/5 @ 4.5 furlongs : Afterglow

Most wins by a jockey:
 2 - Joe McCahey (1913, 1915)
 2 - Albert Johnson (1923, 1925)
 2 - Johnny Loftus (1917, 1919)
 2 - Linus McAtee (1924, 1926)
 2 - Raymond Workman (1930, 1932)

Most wins by a trainer:
 4 - Thomas J. Healey (1915, 1918, 1930, 1932)

Most wins by an owner:
 3 - Rancocas Stable (1921, 1928, 1929)
 3 - Harry Payne Whitney (1920, 1926, 1930)

Winners

References

Discontinued horse races in New York (state)
Belmont Park
Flat horse races for two-year-olds
Sports in Long Island
Recurring sporting events established in 1913
1913 establishments in New York (state)
1933 disestablishments in New York (state)